Le Garçon is the third EP by pop singer Solomon. Released worldwide on February 4, 2014. Lead single "Swim No More" was released October 15, 2013.

Background 
While working on his debut album, Solomon decided to release an EP as a prelude to the album. Titling it "Le Garçon" meaning "the boy" in French, the EP is said to be his darkest work yet.

On July 2, 2013, Solomon released his single for "The Way We Were" with accompanying music video on August 25, 2013. The music video was picked by vevo as one of their top 5 R&B songs. However, it was "Swim No More" that was picked to set the tone for the EP and act as the leading single.

Track listing

References

2014 EPs